Thorictinae is a subfamily of beetles in the family Dermestidae, containing the following genera:

 Afrothorictus Andreae, 1967
 Macrothorictus Andreae, 1967
 Thorictodes Reitter, 1875
 Thorictus Germar, 1834

References

External links
Thorictinae at ITIS

Dermestidae